Zelienople  is a borough in Butler County, Pennsylvania,  north of Pittsburgh. The population was 3,812 at the 2010 census. It is part of the Pittsburgh metropolitan area.

History

Zelienople was named for the eldest daughter of Baron Dettmar Basse (1762–1836), whose chosen name was Zelie (her given name was Fredericka) which she named herself after her favorite doll.

He proceeded to lay out a village and build his own private residence, a three-story castle, complete with towers, turrets and battlements, named "The Bassenheim", which was destroyed by fire on July 29, 1841. At the time, Zelie was betrothed to Philip Louis Passavant, and was still in Germany. Extensive preparations were made by Baron Basse to establish the new home and town in America and prepare it for his daughter's arrival in September 1807.

Baron Basse sold  of his land to George Rapp, a Bavarian pietist religious leader, who founded the village of Harmony. Baron Basse came to be known as "Dr. Muller". Whether the title of "Doctor" was given to him due to a knowledge of medicine, or conferred upon him as a degree, is unknown. He was regarded as an intelligent man, and during the Napoleonic era represented Frankfurt as an ambassador to Paris. Basse returned to Germany in 1818, leaving his business to his son-in-law, Philipp Passavant.

Philip Passavant opened the first store in 1807, and managed it for 41 years, until he gave it to his son, C. S. Passavant. By 1826, there were fifty houses in Zelienople, and three churches. The population in 1870 was 387, and in 1890, it had grown to 639. In 1879, the first passenger train arrived to the town, substantially increasing the growth and commerce. In 1880, the American Union Telegraph Company established an office in Zelienople. The Federalists appointed Andrew McClure, a local tavern-keeper, as the first postmaster of Zelienople in the first decade of 1800. Christian Buhl was named the first justice of the peace in 1840.

Early Zelienople commerce supported the local agriculture community, as there was no viable means of transportation. In 1840 Zelienople was incorporated as a borough. In 1878 a railroad was built through Zelienople. From this time there has been moderate expansion of industry, residences, and local government. There has been a volunteer fire department since about 1850. A full-time Borough Manager was hired in 1994. The growth of Pittsburgh to the south, along with the building of Interstate 79, provides a challenge to Zelienople in coping with these changes through the 21st century.

Zelienople was linked to Ellwood City, Evans City and Pittsburgh in 1908 by the Pittsburgh, Harmony, Butler and New Castle Railway, an interurban trolley line. The line closed on 15 June 1931, and the trolleys were replaced by buses. Zelienople is also known for its historical Eichholtz Building.  The Eichholtz family played a historical and transformational role in Zelienople.

Geography
Zelienople is located in southwestern Butler County, situated on the south bank of Connoquenessing Creek, in an area that is rich with coal and iron ore. The borough is bordered by Jackson Township on the north, southeast, and south, and by the borough of Harmony on the northeast. The western border of Zelienople is the Beaver County line.

U.S. Route 19 (Perry Highway) is the main north–south road through the center of town. Interstate 79, running generally parallel to US 19, passes just to the east of the borough, with access from Exits 85, 87, and 88. To the north I-79 leads  to Erie. Pennsylvania Route 68 runs east from US 19 as East Grandview Avenue and southwest as West Beaver Street.

Demographics

As of the census of 2000, there were 4,123 people, 1,956 households, and 1,054 families residing in the borough. The population density was 1,938.1 people per square mile (747.4/km2). There were 2,113 housing units at an average density of 993.3 per square mile (383.0/km2). The racial makeup of the borough was 97.91% White, 0.39% African American, 0.07% Native American, 0.65% Asian, 0.17% from other races, and 0.80% from two or more races. Hispanic or Latino of any race were 0.32% of the population.

There were 1,956 households, out of which 22.4% had children under the age of 18 living with them, 45.3% were married couples living together, 6.4% had a female householder with no husband present, and 46.1% were non-families. 41.7% of all households were made up of individuals, and 25.7% had someone living alone who was 65 years of age or older. The average household size was 2.07 and the average family size was 2.87.

In the borough the population was spread out, with 21.1% under the age of 18, 6.5% from 18 to 24, 28.3% from 25 to 44, 20.4% from 45 to 64, and 23.8% who were 65 years of age or older. The median age was 41 years. For every 100 females there were 84.6 males. For every 100 females age 18 and over, there were 79.3 males.

The median income for a household in the borough was $40,250, and the median income for a family was $52,426. The per capita income for the borough was $23,555. About 0.2% of families and 0.7% of the population were below the poverty line, including 0.4% of those under age 18 and 0.3% of those age 65 or over.

Culture and events 

Every year, Zelienople hosts a Fourth of July parade through downtown. The Strand Theater is a performing arts center on Main Street that has been restored, and hosts concerts and films for the borough and surrounding area.

For the past 44 years, one of the major annual events is the town's summer Horse Trading Days Arts and Music Festival. Crafters, vendors, entertainers and tourists are drawn from the entire tri-state area to participate in the family-oriented event that features concerts, games, contests, shopping, food, and a  run/walk event. The festival funding comes from local residents, businesses, the police and fire department, Lancaster Township, and the Zelienople borough.

See also
 Baldinger's Market
 Harmony, Pennsylvania

References

Further reading
Jennings, Zelie. Some account of Dettmar Basse, the Passavant family and their arrival in America. (Zelienople Historical Society, 1988)

External links

Borough of Zelienople official website
Zelienople Historical Society
Zelienople-Harmony Area Chamber of Commerce
Zelienople & Harmony Annual Horse Trading Days
Strand Theater
http://www.myzeliepark.org/

Populated places established in 1802
Pittsburgh metropolitan area
Boroughs in Butler County, Pennsylvania
1840 establishments in Pennsylvania